Dobříkov is a municipality and village in Ústí nad Orlicí District in the Pardubice Region of the Czech Republic. It has about 600 inhabitants.

Administrative parts
The village of Rzy is an administrative part of Dobříkov.

References

External links

 

Villages in Ústí nad Orlicí District